Alf Ove Segersäll (born 16 March 1956) is a Swedish former racing cyclist. He competed in the individual road race event at the 1976 Summer Olympics.

His sporting career began with IF Saab Linköping.

Major results

1973
 1st  Road race, National Junior Road Championships
1974
 1st  Road race, National Junior Road Championships
 1st Overall International 3-Etappen-Rundfahrt
1975
 1st Skandisloppet
 3rd Road race, National Road Championships
1976
 1st Stage 8 Okolo Slovenska
1977
 1st  Road race, National Road Championships
 1st  Overall Flèche du Sud
 2nd Overall Giro Ciclistico d'Italia
 2nd Overall Milk Race
1978
 1st  Overall Flèche du Sud
 8th Overall Circuit Cycliste Sarthe
1979
 1st  Overall Giro Ciclistico d'Italia
1st Stage 5
1980
 1st Stage 3 Giro di Sardegna
 2nd Coppa Bernocchi
 4th Overall Tirreno–Adriatico
 7th Coppa Placci
 8th Overall Deutschland Tour
1981
 1st Trofeo Matteotti
 1st Stage 4 Tour de Romandie
1982
 1st  Overall Giro di Puglia
1st Stages 2 & 3
 1st  Overall Ruota d'Oro
1st Stage 2
 4th Overall Tour of Sweden
1st Stage 3
1983
 1st Stages 1 (TTT) & 12 Giro d'Italia
 3rd Trofeo Baracchi (with Tommy Prim)
1984
 2nd Trofeo Baracchi (with Tommy Prim)
 2nd Overall Tour of Sweden
1985
 10th GP Industria & Artigianato di Larciano

Grand Tour general classification results timeline

References

External links 

1956 births
Living people
Swedish male cyclists
Swedish Giro d'Italia stage winners
Olympic cyclists of Sweden
Cyclists at the 1976 Summer Olympics
People from Surahammar Municipality
Sportspeople from Västmanland County
20th-century Swedish people
21st-century Swedish people